Creat Studios, Inc. was a video game developer based in Canton, Massachusetts with a development studio in Saint Petersburg, Russia. It was founded in 1990. Vladimir Starzhevsky served as the company's chief executive officer.

Creat Studios ceased making games in 2012 to 2013. They then changed focus to designing websites. The company's last Russian website may have closed in 2021.

Notable games 
 RC Cars/Smash Cars (2002)
 American Chopper 2: Full Throttle (2005)
 Biker Mice from Mars (2006)
 Mahjong Tales: Ancient Wisdom (2007)
 Coded Arms: Contagion (2007)
 Aqua Teen Hunger Force Zombie Ninja Pro-Am (2007)
 Bratz: Super Babyz (2008)
 Insecticide (2008)
 Tony Hawk's Motion (2008)
 Cuboid (2009)
 Magic Orbz (2009)
 Digger HD (2009)
 Mushroom Wars (2009)
 Wakeboarding HD (2010)
 Mecho Wars (2012)

References

External links 
 
 
 Wiki-RU wiki (Old archived page at one Russian wiki website. Last modified in April 2016.)

Video game lists by company
Video game companies of Russia